Line in the sand is an idiom, a metaphorical (sometimes literal) point beyond which no further advance will be accepted or made.

Line(s) in the Sand may also refer to:

 Lines in the Sand (book), a 2007 book by Steve Bickerstaff about the 2003 Texas congressional redistricting
 Line in the sand match, an infamous Australian rules football match in 2004
 Lines in the Sand, a 2003 novel by Rhiannon Lassiter
 A Line in the Sand (TV series), a 2004 British television mini-series
 A Line in the Sand (film), a made-for-TV movie directed by Jeffrey Chernov
 A Line in the Sand (board game), a 1991 board game by TSR
 A Line in the Sand (video game), a 1992 video game by Strategic Simulations based on the board game
 "A Line in the Sand" (Dear America), a 1998 book in the Dear America series

Television Episodes 
 "Line in the Sand" (Stargate SG-1), an episode of Stargate SG-1
 "Lines in the Sand" (House), a 2006 episode of the TV series House
 "Line in the Sand" (La Femme Nikita), a 2000 episode of the TV series La Femme Nikita
 "Line in the Sand" (Pacific Blue), a 1996 episode of the TV series Pacific Blue
 "A Line in the Sand" (Lego Ninjago: Masters of Spinjitzu), a 2017 episode of the TV series Lego Ninjago: Masters of Spinjitzu

Music 
 Line in the Sand (ZOX album), 2008
 Line in the Sand (Close Your Eyes album), 2013
 "Line in the Sand" (Bleeding Through song), 2007
 "Line in the Sand" (Motörhead song), 2004
 Lines in the Sand (Antonio Sanchez & Migration album), 2019
 "Line in the Sand", a song by Brett Kissel from his 2023 album The Compass Project
 "Lines in the Sand", a song by Dream Theater from their 1997 album Falling into Infinity
 "A Line in the Sand", a song by Linkin Park from their 2014 album The Hunting Party
 "Line in the Sand", a song by Art Alexakis from his 2019 album Sun Songs